Sogdini is a tribe of round fungus beetles in the family Leiodidae. There are about 7 genera and at least 20 described species in Sogdini.

Genera
 Hydnobius Schmidt, 1841
 Kalohydnobius Peck & Cook, 2009
 Macrohydnobius Peck & Cook, 2009
 Platyhydnobius Peck & Cook, 2009
 Sogda Lopatin, 1961
 Stereus Wollaston, 1857
 Triarthron Märkel, 1840

References

Citations

Sources

 Bouchard, P., Y. Bousquet, A. Davies, M. Alonso-Zarazaga, J. Lawrence, C. Lyal, A. Newton, et al. (2011). "Family-group names in Coleoptera (Insecta)". ZooKeys, vol. 88, 1–972.
 Majka C, Langor D (2008). "The Leiodidae (Coleoptera) of Atlantic Canada: new records, faunal composition, and zoogeography". . ZooKeys 2: 357–402.
 Peck, Stewart B. / Arnett, Ross H. Jr. and Michael C. Thomas, eds. (2001). "Family 19. Leiodidae Fleming, 1821". American Beetles, vol. 1: Archostemata, Myxophaga, Adephaga, Polyphaga: Staphyliniformia, 250–258.
 Peck, Stewart B., and Joyce Cook (2009). "Review of the Sogdini of North and Central America (Coleoptera: Leiodidae: Leiodinae) with descriptions of fourteen new species and three new genera".

Further reading

 Arnett, R. H. Jr., M. C. Thomas, P. E. Skelley and J. H. Frank. (eds.). (21 June 2002). American Beetles, Volume II: Polyphaga: Scarabaeoidea through Curculionoidea. CRC Press LLC, Boca Raton, Florida .
 Arnett, Ross H. (2000). American Insects: A Handbook of the Insects of America North of Mexico. CRC Press.
 Richard E. White. (1983). Peterson Field Guides: Beetles. Houghton Mifflin Company.

Leiodidae
Beetle tribes